Adolf Dinglreiter (born 27 October 1935) is a German politician from the Christian Social Union of Bavaria. He was a member of the Landtag of Bavaria  from 1986 to 2003.

References

1935 births
Living people
People from Passau
Members of the Landtag of Bavaria
Christian Social Union in Bavaria politicians